, better known by the stage name , is a Japanese actor, voice actor, singer and narrator who is affiliated with Aoni Production. He first started acting as a child. Canna is best known for his performances as Tasuki (Fushigi Yûgi), Ban Mido (GetBackers), Nnoitra Gilga (Bleach), Lancer (Fate/Stay Night), Basara Nekki (Macross 7), Kabuto Yakushi (Naruto), Cao Pi in Dynasty Warriors and Warriors Orochi series, Kai Kogashiwa in Initial D anime and mostly video game is Initial D Arcade Stage series from Arcade Stage 4 all the way to Arcade Stage 8 infinity, Guts (Berserk), Knuckles the Echidna (Sonic the Hedgehog franchise, since 1998), Lancer (Fate (series) ) Lee Pai-Long (Shaman King), Brian Stelbart (Feda: The Emblem of Justice) and Nowaki Kusama (Junjo Romantica: Pure Romance).

Filmography

Anime

Movies

Games

Tokusatsu

Drama CDs

Dubbing roles

Live-action

Animation

References 

 Nakagami, Yoshikatsu. "The Official Art of AIR". (October 2007) Newtype USA. pp. 135–141.
 Endo, Akira et al. "Voice Actor Spotlight". (November 2006) Newtype USA. pp. 110–111.

External links 
  
  
 
 Nobutoshi Hayashi and Nobutoshi Canna at the Seiyuu database
 Nobutushi Hayashi at Ryu's Seiyuu Info
 
 
 

1968 births
Living people
Japanese male child actors
Japanese male pop singers
Japanese male stage actors
Japanese male video game actors
Japanese male voice actors
Sega people
Male voice actors from Tokyo Metropolis
People from Shinagawa
20th-century Japanese male actors
21st-century Japanese male actors
20th-century Japanese male singers
20th-century Japanese singers
21st-century Japanese male singers
21st-century Japanese singers